Redbank is a locality in central Victoria, Australia.

In 1860 Gold was discovered in Redbank leading to about 2000 people to rush to the area however in 1861 gold was found elsewhere and much of the town relocated.

References

External links

Towns in Victoria (Australia)